is an interchange passenger railway station located in the city of Maizuru, Kyoto, Japan, and operated by the West Japan Railway Company (JR West).

Lines
It is also served by the Obama Line and is 84.3 kilometers from the terminus of that line at ..

Station layout

The station consists of one elevated island platform serving two tracks, with the station building underneath. The station has a "Midori no Madoguchi" staffed ticket counter.

Platforms

Two trains can share the same track.

Trains for the Obama Line use the northern end of the tracks, and trains for the Maizuru Line use the southwestern end of the tracks.

Adjacent stations

History
It was renamed on 1 June 1939. The original station building was demolished in 1996 when the station was rebuilt as an elevated structure.

Passenger statistics
In fiscal 2019, the station was used by an average of 1,537 passengers daily.

Surrounding area
 Maizuru redbrick warehouses
 Maizuru Redbrick Museum
 Maizuru Police Station
 Maizuru Municipal Hospital
 Maizuru Kyosai Hospital
 National Hospital Organization Maizuru Medical Center

See also
List of railway stations in Japan

References

External links

 Higashi-Maizuru Station information (JR West) 

Railway stations in Kyoto Prefecture
Railway stations in Japan opened in 1904
Maizuru